The Lower George Hotel, now the Lower George Inn, is a grade II listed building at 121 Westgate Street, Gloucester.

For some time the building was home to the 'Pig Inn the City', which closed in 2011. After refurbishment it has opened again under its original name.

References

External links
http://www.gloucestershirepubs.co.uk/AllGlosPubsDatabase/RAIGConnection.php?pubid1=1744

Grade II listed pubs in Gloucestershire
Pubs in Gloucester
Westgate, Gloucester
Pubs in Gloucestershire